Moonrise by the Sea or Moonrise over the Sea (German: Mondaufgang am Meer) is an 1822 oil-on-canvas painting by German painter Caspar David Friedrich. The work depicts a romantic seascape.  

Three young people, two women side by side and a man further back, are sitting on a large boulder by the sea, silhouetted against the sky as they watch the moon rising to the east above a band of clouds. In the distance are two sailing vessels, ghosting on a light breeze towards the spectators on the shore. The painting is probably a view of the Baltic Sea, near Friedrich's birthplace in Swedish Pomerania. It may be based on the beach at Stubbenkammer near Rügen.

The work was commissioned by banker and art collector Joachim Heinrich Wilhelm Wagener, together with a second work, The Lonely Tree (Der einsame Baum), to create a pair of "times of the day", depicting morning and evening landscape scenes, in a tradition of Claude Lorrain. It was completed before November 1822 and has been held by the Berlin National Gallery since 1861, donated by Wagener as part of its founding collection. It is now in the Alte Nationalgalerie of the Staatliche Museen in Berlin.

See also
List of works by Caspar David Friedrich

References
 Mondaufgang am Meer (1822), Staatliche Museen zu Berlin
 Caspar David Friedrich: Moonwatchers, p. 40-41
 Moonrise over the Sea (1821), Hermitage Museum

External links

Paintings by Caspar David Friedrich
Maritime paintings
Paintings in the collection of the Alte Nationalgalerie
1822 paintings
Moon in art